Dikodougou Department is a department of Poro Region in Savanes District, Ivory Coast. In 2021, its population was 102,115 and its seat is the settlement of Dikodougou. The sub-prefectures of the department are Boron, Dikodougou and Guiembé.

History
Dikodougou Department was created in 2011 as part of the restructuring of the subdivisions of Ivory Coast, when departments were converted from the second-level administrative subdivisions of the country to the third-level subdivisions. It was created by splitting Korhogo Department.

Notes

Departments of Poro Region
States and territories established in 2011
2011 establishments in Ivory Coast